The 1905 Wellington City mayoral election was part of the New Zealand local elections held that same year. In 1905, elections were held for the Mayor of Wellington plus other local government positions including fifteen city councillors. The polling was conducted using the standard first-past-the-post electoral method.

Background
John Aitken, the incumbent Mayor did not seek re-election. He was succeeded by Thomas William Hislop, who was elected to office as Mayor of Wellington, beating defeating five other candidates.

Mayoralty results

Councillor results

References

Mayoral elections in Wellington
1905 elections in New Zealand
Politics of the Wellington Region
1900s in Wellington